Maple Valley Township is the name of a few townships in the United States:

Maple Valley Township, Buena Vista County, Iowa
Maple Valley Township, Montcalm County, Michigan
Maple Valley Township, Sanilac County, Michigan

Township name disambiguation pages